Prairie Creek (also Middletown) is an unincorporated community in southeastern Prairie Creek Township, Vigo County, in the U.S. state of Indiana. Its elevation is 528 feet (161 m), and it is located at  (39.2750390, -87.4972443).  Because the community has had multiple names, the Board on Geographic Names officially decided in favor of "Prairie Creek" in 1959.  Although Prairie Creek is unincorporated, it has a post office, with the ZIP code of 47869.

The community is part of the Terre Haute Metropolitan Statistical Area.

History
The town of Middletown was laid out August 24, 1831, by James D. Piety on the old Vincennes Road. Early businesses included Daniel Ryerson's hotel and drug store, Jonas P. Lykins's store, Z. J. Hunt's hotel, and Hiram Hight's steam mill in 1847. Jacob Ernest built the first brick house, in 1849.

The post office at Prairie Creek has been in operation since 1822.

Geography
Prairie Creek lies at the intersection of State Roads 63 and 246 southwest of the city of Terre Haute, the county seat of Vigo County.

References

Unincorporated communities in Vigo County, Indiana
Unincorporated communities in Indiana
Terre Haute metropolitan area